Beal City is an unincorporated community in Isabella County in the U.S. state of Michigan. It is a census-designated place (CDP) for statistical purposes, although Beal City is not an incorporated municipality and holds no legal autonomy. The population was 357 at the 2010 census. It is in Nottawa Township within the Isabella Indian Reservation of the Saginaw Chippewa Tribal Council.

Geography
The land drains east toward the North Branch of the Chippewa River, part of the Saginaw River watershed.

History
Beal City was established in 1880 and given a post office in 1892.

Demographics

As of the census of 2000, there were 345 people, 124 households, and 91 families residing in the CDP. The racial makeup of the CDP was 98.84% White, 0.29% Native American, 0.29% from other races, and 0.58% from two or more races. Hispanic or Latino of any race were 0.29% of the population.

There were 124 households, out of which 38.7% had children under the age of 18 living with them, 63.7% were married couples living together, 4.0% had a female householder with no husband present, and 26.6% were non-families. 20.2% of all households were made up of individuals, and 8.1% had someone living alone who was 65 years of age or older.  The average household size was 2.77 and the average family size was 3.24.

In the CDP, the population was spread out, with 31.3% under the age of 18, 7.5% from 18 to 24, 30.1% from 25 to 44, 16.2% from 45 to 64, and 14.8% who were 65 years of age or older.  The median age was 34 years. For every 100 females, there were 98.3 males.  For every 100 females age 18 and over, there were 99.2 males.

The median income for a household in the CDP was $37,500, and the median income for a family was $50,250. Males had a median income of $31,875 versus $33,750 for females. The per capita income for the CDP was $16,185.  About 5.5% of families and 10.3% of the population were below the poverty line, including 8.2% of those under age 18 and 8.5% of those age 65 or over.

Beal City Public Schools 

Beal City Public Schools is a kindergarten through 12th grade public school. In the 2009–2010 school year there were 338 enrolled students from all over Isabella County. The mascot of Beal City Public Schools is the Aggie, the name derived from agriculture, as the community is focused on farming. The mascot is represented as a mechanical Pegasus over a blue star. In 2009 the Beal City Aggies won the Division 8 Football State Championship held in Ford Field in Detroit. In 1993, 2009 and 2010 the Aggies won the Division IV Baseball State Championship. In 2010 Beal City High School has been awarded the bronze medal in the annual list of America's Best High Schools put out by U.S. News & World Report.

Notable people 

 John Engler, 46th governor of Michigan; grew up on a cattle farm near Beal City
 Dan Schafer, pop and country songwriter/musician

References

Unincorporated communities in Isabella County, Michigan
Census-designated places in Michigan
Populated places established in 1880
1880 establishments in Michigan
Unincorporated communities in Michigan
Census-designated places in Isabella County, Michigan